The Bay Centre (formerly the Victoria Eaton Centre) is a shopping mall in Victoria, British Columbia, Canada. It is bounded by Douglas, Government, Fort, and View streets, in the city's historic centre. It has  of retail space.

Opening in 1989, the mall was the first large shopping mall in downtown Victoria. It occupies two city blocks of the Old Town area, including the site of the original downtown Eaton's store (previously Spencer's) at 1150 Douglas Street. Eaton's was demolished in 1987–88 to make way for the Eaton Centre project. The development of the shopping centre was initially the subject of controversy, as construction involved demolishing several historic buildings (or reducing them to facades in front of new construction) and closing one block of Broad Street.

The centre was initially a partnership between Eaton's and Cadillac Fairview. When Eaton's went bankrupt in 1999, the Eaton's store in this mall was occupied first by Sears Canada, and then by The Bay (now Hudson's Bay), for which the mall was renamed.

Anchors and majors
Hudson's Bay
Passport Canada
Sport Chek
Winners

See also
Eaton Centre
List of shopping malls in Canada

References

External links

Architectural artifacts An historical overview of the location.

Eaton's
Buildings and structures in Victoria, British Columbia
Shopping malls established in 1989
Shopping malls in British Columbia
Tourist attractions in Victoria, British Columbia
1989 establishments in British Columbia